Howard Wayne "Red" Hickey (February 14, 1917 – March 30, 2006) was an American football player and coach.  He played professionally in the National Football League (NFL) with the Pittsburgh Steelers in 1941 and the Cleveland / Los Angeles Rams from 1945 to 1948.  Hickey served as head coach for the NFL's San Francisco 49ers from 1959 to 1963.  He devised the shotgun formation in 1960.

Early years and education
A native of Clarksville, Arkansas, Hickey attended the University of Arkansas, competing as a member of the football and basketball teams, where he won All-Conference accolades in both sports. In 1941, he was a forward on the Razorback team that reached the Final Four teams, although the tournament format was different from today and did not end in a four team final. While at the University of Arkansas, Hickey was a member of Xi chapter of the Kappa Sigma Fraternity.

NFL playing career
Hickey was drafted by the Philadelphia Eagles in the sixth round (41st overall) of the 1941 NFL Draft. His rights were transferred to the Pittsburgh Steelers due to the events later referred to as the Pennsylvania Polka. He also played for the Cleveland Rams, then missed the next three years while serving as a U.S. Navy gunnery officer during World War II. Upon his return, he was part of the 1945 Rams championship squad, then shifted with the team to Los Angeles to play from 1946 to 1948. During his first season back, he also married his high school sweetheart, Cecelia Surina.

NFL coaching career

Despite having finished the 1948 NFL season as the team's second-leading receiver with 30 catches for 509 yards and seven touchdowns, Hickey retired and joined the Rams' coaching ranks on April 20, 1949 as wide receivers coach. He remained in that capacity with the team for six seasons until resigning on December 12, 1954 along with his fellow assistants. The departure was the end result of continued conflicts with head coach Hamp Pool.

Just over two weeks after leaving the Rams, Hickey was hired as a 49ers assistant under new head coach Red Strader, but after the team struggled during the 1955 season, Strader was replaced in favor of former 49er quarterback Frankie Albert. Hickey stayed as an assistant during the three years Albert handled sideline duties for the team, and in 1957, helped quarterback Y. A. Tittle and wide receiver R.C. Owens develop what became known as the "Alley-Oop" pass. The play was designed to take advantage of Owens's phenomenal leaping abilities and proved to be a success.

When Albert resigned following the 1958 season, citing the constant fan abuse heaped on not only him, but his family, Hickey was promoted to head coach on December 16 and received a three-year contract.

During that first season, the 49ers put up a stiff challenge to the defending champion Baltimore Colts, managing a tie for the Western Conference lead with two games to play. However, on December 5, the Colts broke the deadlock with a 34–14 victory and went on to capture another NFL title.

The following season saw the team battle inconsistency for the first two-thirds of the campaign until Hickey unveiled his innovative new offense on November 27, when the 49ers faced the favored Colts. Hickey sought to find a way to combat the Colts' strong pass rush and reasoned that having the quarterback stand seven yards back behind the line of scrimmage in what he called the "shotgun formation" would give the signal caller more time to throw, as well as force adjustments by Baltimore's defense. The end result was a shocking 30–22 upset, with third-string quarterback Bob Waters surprisingly using the formation to aid the team's running game.  The team won three of its final four games to again finish 7–5 and seemed ready to challenge for greater things in 1961, with Hickey in place for the expected surge with a new three-year contract.

Hickey then made a dramatic change in the chemistry of the team during the offseason when he traded Tittle. The veteran's absence appeared to make no difference when the season began with the team using the quarterback trio of John Brodie, Waters and rookie Billy Kilmer. After winning four of their first five games, including shutout wins over the Rams and Detroit Lions, the magic disappeared on October 22, when the Chicago Bears blanked the 49ers, 31–0.

The Bears had moved linebacker Bill George from his regular spot up to the line of scrimmage, where he and his teammates were able to develop a strong pass rush, essentially putting an end to the shotgun formation's effectiveness. The absence of a true leader behind center was magnified when Tittle led his new team, the New York Giants, to the first of three consecutive berths in the NFL Championship game.

After the team's 7–6–1 campaign in 1961, the 49ers dropped slightly the following year, finishing 6–8.  When the team lost its first three games in 1963, the last coming in a 45–14 thrashing by the Minnesota Vikings, Hickey resigned on September 30, and two weeks later was hired as a Rams' scout for the remainder of the year.

Scouting and later life

On February 1, 1964, he joined the Cowboys as the offensive end coach, serving for two years under Tom Landry. He had been a strong candidate to become head coach of the expansion Atlanta Falcons, but the post was given to Green Bay assistant Norb Hecker on January 26, 1966. Just six weeks later, Hickey resigned his coaching position and asked to join the Cowboy scouting staff.

Hickey spent the next two decades as a Cowboys scout and watched with pride when his team dusted off his old offense in 1975, using it only in specific situations, but popularizing a strategy that remains to this day. He retired as a scout in 1982.

On an individual level, he was elected to the Arkansas Sports Hall of Fame in 1968, while his son, Mike, followed him into the world of scouting, working for the New England Patriots and New York Jets.

Head coaching record

NFL

References

External links

 
 Red Hickey, 89; NFL Player, Coach Invented Shotgun Formation

1917 births
2006 deaths
American football ends
Arkansas Razorbacks football players
Arkansas Razorbacks men's basketball players
Bainbridge Commodores football players
Cleveland Rams players
Dallas Cowboys coaches
Dallas Cowboys scouts
Great Lakes Navy Bluejackets football players
Los Angeles Rams coaches
Los Angeles Rams players
Los Angeles Rams scouts
Pittsburgh Steelers players
San Francisco 49ers coaches
San Francisco 49ers head coaches
People from Clarksville, Arkansas
Players of American football from Arkansas
Basketball players from Arkansas
American men's basketball players
United States Navy personnel of World War II